Arabic rock describes a wide variety of forms of music made in the Arab World. Although no major Arabic rock bands existed before the year 2000, the alternative music scene boomed afterwards with the creation of popular bands. Many Arab musicians have adopted musical forms foreign to Arab culture, like rock music, and have attempted to arabize them.

References

Arabic music
Rock music genres